Sarcohyla siopela, also known as the voiceless treefrog or mute treefrog, is a species of frog in the family Hylidae. It is endemic to Mexico and only known from the west slope of the Cofre de Perote Mountain, in Sierra Madre Oriental, central Veracruz. It is feared that the species might be extinct.

Etymology
The specific name siopela is derived from the Greek siopelos, which means "silent" and refers to the lack of a voice in this species.

Description
Adult males measure  and females  in snout–vent length. The snout is truncate. The tympanum is partly concealed and indistinct. The fingers have vestigial webbing whereas the toes are moderately webbed. The dorsum is pale green to olive green, with darker green or black flecks or reticulations, or pinkish tan in color, carrying dark brown or black flecks or reticulations. Juveniles are uniform pale green. Males have prepollex (the "spikethumb") that is large and flat and bears small nuptial spines. They lack vocal slits and appear to be mute.

Habitat and conservation
The natural habitats of this species dry pine forest where it is found only in mountain streams in crevices and rocks. At night, these frogs were found sitting on rocks and branches in the spray of cascades. By day, they were found in crevices and under rocks behind small cascades.

Sarcohyla siopela used to be abundant, but, as of 2010, had not been seen for more 10 years, in spite of surveys in suitable habitats in the area of the type locality. The specific stream from where it was first found has dried up because the water has been diverted elsewhere. Its apparent disappearance from the remaining suitable habitat suggests that chytridiomycosis might also be at play. The range is within the Cofre de Perote National Park.

References

siopela
Endemic amphibians of Mexico
Fauna of the Trans-Mexican Volcanic Belt
Natural history of Veracruz
Amphibians described in 1968
Taxonomy articles created by Polbot